Beilby is a given name and surname. Notable people with the name include:

Given name
Sir Beilby Alston (1868–1929), British diplomat
Beilby Lawley, 2nd Baron Wenlock (1818–1880), British soldier and politician
Beilby Lawley, 3rd Baron Wenlock (1849–1912), British soldier, politician, Governor of Madras
Beilby Porteus or Porteous (1731–1809), successively Bishop of Chester and of London, an Anglican reformer
Beilby Thompson (1742–1799), British landowner and politician

Surname
George Thomas Beilby (1850–1924), British chemist
 The Beilby Medal and Prize, named after him
Marcus Beilby (born 1951), Australian artist, realist painter and winner of 1987 Sulman Prize
Ralph Beilby (1744–1817), English engraver working chiefly on silver and copper
William Beilby (1740–1819), British glassworker who produced enamelled glass
William Beilby (physician) (1783–1849), English-Scottish philanthropic physician